The Espace 1300 (English: Space) is a French sailboat that was designed by Philippe Briand as a cruiser and first built in 1981. The boat is part of the Espace series of cruising sailboats and its designation indicates its approximate length overall in centimeters.

The boat's hull design was reused for the 1983 Sun Kiss 45.

Production
The design was built by Jeanneau in France starting in 1981, but it is now out of production.

Design
The Espace 1300 is a recreational keelboat, built predominantly of fiberglass, with wood trim and a masthead sloop rig. The hull has a raked stem, a reverse transom, an internally mounted spade-type rudder controlled by a two wheels, one on the cockpit and one in the wheelhouse, It has a stub keel and retractable centerboard, or optional fixed fin keel. It displaces  and carries  of ballast.

The design has sleeping accommodation for seven people, with a double berth and a single berth in the forward cabin and two aft cabins, each with a double berth. The main salon has a "U" shaped settee around a dinette table on the port side. The galley is located on the starboard side amidships. The galley is "U"-shaped and is equipped with a two-burner stove and a double sink. The navigation station is located in the raised wheelhouse, on the port side. There are two heads, one just forward of the forward cabin in the bow and one on the starboard side below the wheelhouse.

See also
List of sailing boat types

References

External links

Keelboats
1980s sailboat type designs
Sailing yachts
Sailboat type designs by Philippe Briand
Sailboat types built by Jeanneau